The Capital Traction Company Car Barn, at 4615 14th St., NW. in Washington, D.C., was built in 1906.  It was listed on the National Register of Historic Places in 2013.  Also known as the Decatur Street Car Barn and the Northern Bus Garage, it was built to serve the Capital Traction Company.

It is a two-story brick streetcar car barn designed by local architects Wood, Donn & Deming in Italian Renaissance style.

It is located at the end of the Fourteenth Street streetcar line.  It included two turntables.  It was built by construction contractors Richardson and Burgess in 1906 and was then  in plan.

It was converted to a bus garage in 1959;  the Washington Rapid Transit had leased part of its space for use as a bus garage starting in 1926.

References

External links

Capital Traction Company Car Barn, at National Park Service

Railway buildings and structures on the National Register of Historic Places in Washington, D.C.
Renaissance Revival architecture in Washington, D.C.
Transport infrastructure completed in 1906
1906 establishments in Washington, D.C.